Manoj Kumar (born 15 June 1964) was a member of the 14th Lok Sabha of India. He represented the Palamau constituency of Jharkhand and is a member of the Rashtriya Janata Dal (RJD) political party.

He was expelled from the Lok Sabha in December 2005, following allegations of improper conduct. An investigation showed that Kumar and 10 other Members of Parliament had accepted money in exchange for raising certain questions in parliament, and all eleven MPs were expelled.

References

External links
Home Page on the Parliament of India's Website

1964 births
Living people
People from Palamu district
India MPs 2004–2009
Rashtriya Janata Dal politicians
Lok Sabha members from Jharkhand
People expelled from public office